Worst Week is an American sitcom television series that premiered  on CBS on September 22, 2008. The series was based on the British sitcom The Worst Week of My Life. It was adapted for American audiences by Fox under the title Worst Week of My Life, but a series didn't materialize after the pilot was filmed.

The series aired on CBS Mondays at 9:30pm ET/PT, following Two and a Half Men. The premiere attracted 11 million viewers but lost a third of its lead-in audience. Ratings dropped to a low of 8.4 million viewers with the sixth episode, but then began to climb steadily, reaching a high of 12.12 million viewers with the eleventh episode before declining again.

On May 20, 2009, CBS cancelled the series after one season and the series finale aired on June 6, 2009.

Cast

Main characters
Kyle Bornheimer as Sam Briggs 
Erinn Hayes as Melanie "Mel" Clayton-Briggs
Nancy Lenehan as Angela Clayton
Kurtwood Smith as Dick Clayton

Recurring characters
Nick Kroll as Adam
Jessica St. Clair as Sarah
Ken Jeong as Phil
Parris Mosteller as Scotty
Brooke Nevin as Chloe Clayton
RonReaco Lee as David Clayton
Hayes McArthur as Chad
Fred Willard as Paul Briggs
Olympia Dukakis as June Clayton 
Phillip Baker Hall as Reverend Lowell

Episodes

Critical reception
Verne Gay of Newsday graded it A and said it "may be the best new comedy on network TV this season." 
Less enthusiastic was Tim Goodman of the San Francisco Chronicle, who said, "Though there are plenty of hard-earned (some might say forced) laughs here and Bornheimer is a real find, you can't help but wonder how they'll keep up the pace. After all, the British series ran for only two seasons and had a mere seven episodes each season...So how is CBS going to stretch this into 22 episodes without stretching it too thin?...In many ways, Worst Week seems incapable of being made into an American version (there were previous attempts that failed), because not only does the title not make sense, but not having a payoff for all the freaky, not-so-karmic woes Sam endures will be frustrating to the viewing audience . . . [It] is a series that may end up being on a short leash."

Linda Stasi of the New York Post called it "one of the worst new shows of the week" and added, "Only a man (or a couple of them) could get paid big bucks in Hollywood to come up with such a lame-o rip-off and perpetuate the fantasy that gorgeous women can't help but to love out-of-shape guys who do everything wrong."

Home media
Universal Studios Home Entertainment has released a DVD of the complete series.

References

External links
 

 
 
 

2000s American single-camera sitcoms
2008 American television series debuts
2009 American television series endings
Television shows set in Virginia
Television series by CBS Studios
Television series by Universal Television
American television series based on British television series
CBS original programming
English-language television shows
Television series by Hat Trick Productions